In geometry, the trioctagonal tiling is a semiregular tiling of the hyperbolic plane, representing a rectified Order-3 octagonal tiling. There are two triangles and two octagons alternating on each vertex. It has Schläfli symbol of r{8,3}.

Symmetry

Related polyhedra and tilings 
From a Wythoff construction there are eight hyperbolic uniform tilings that can be based from the regular octagonal tiling. 

Drawing the tiles colored as red on the original faces, yellow at the original vertices, and blue along the original edges, there are 8 forms.

It can also be generated from the (4 3 3) hyperbolic tilings:

The trioctagonal tiling  can be seen in a sequence of quasiregular polyhedrons and tilings:

See also 

 Trihexagonal tiling - 3.6.3.6 tiling
 Rhombille tiling - dual V3.6.3.6 tiling
 Tilings of regular polygons
 List of uniform tilings

References
 John H. Conway, Heidi Burgiel, Chaim Goodman-Strass, The Symmetries of Things 2008,  (Chapter 19, The Hyperbolic Archimedean Tessellations)

External links 

 Hyperbolic and Spherical Tiling Gallery
 KaleidoTile 3: Educational software to create spherical, planar and hyperbolic tilings
 Hyperbolic Planar Tessellations, Don Hatch

Hyperbolic tilings
Isogonal tilings
Isotoxal tilings
Semiregular tilings
Quasiregular polyhedra